Sloknuten Peak
A peak, 2,765 m, rising just SW of Slokstallen Mountain in the Mühlig-Hofmann Mountains, Queen Maud Land. Mapped by Norwegian cartographers from surveys and air photos by the Sixth Norwegian Antarctic Expedition (1956–60) and named Sloknuten (the millrace peak).

See also
 List of mountains of Queen Maud Land

References

Mountains of Queen Maud Land
Princess Martha Coast